Laws governing lesbian, gay, bisexual, and transgender (LGBT) rights are complex in Asia, and acceptance of LGBT persons varies widely. Same-sex sexual activity is outlawed in at least twenty Asian countries. , Cyprus, Israel and Taiwan provide a wider range of LGBT rights – such as same-sex relationship recognition, while at least nine countries, such as Georgia, Singapore and Thailand, have enacted protections for LGBT people. In Afghanistan, Brunei, Iran, Qatar, Saudi Arabia, the United Arab Emirates and Yemen  homosexual activity is punishable with the death penalty. In addition, LGBT people also face extrajudicial executions from non-state actors such as the Islamic State of Iraq and the Levant and Hamas in the Gaza Strip. While egalitarian relationships have become more frequent in recent years, they remain rare. 

Many Asian countries have collectivist cultures, wherein aggression is generally accepted by society if it is used to protect the family honor. Homosexuality is generally considered to be dishonorable, so homophobic aggression in the name of protecting family honor is common. The Fatawa-e-Alamgiri of the Mughal Empire mandated a common set of punishments for homosexuality, which could include 50 lashes for a slave, 100 for a free infidel, or death by stoning for a Muslim.

In 2019, a survey by The Economist found 45% of respondents in the Asia-Pacific believed that same-sex marriage is inevitable in the region, while 31% of respondents disagreed. Furthermore, three-quarters of those surveyed reported a more open climate for LGBT rights compared to three years ago. Of those reporting an improving climate for LGBT people, 38% cited a change in policies or laws. Meanwhile, 36% said coverage of LGBT issues in mainstream media was a major factor. The top reasons cited for diminishing openness was anti-LGBT advocacy by religious institutions.

See also

Recognition of same-sex unions in Asia
Human rights in Asia
Over the Rainbow (organization)
LGBT rights by country or territory
LGBT rights in Europe
LGBT rights in the Americas
LGBT rights in Oceania
LGBT rights in Africa

References

 
Law-related lists
Minimum ages
Sex laws
Sexuality and age
Youth rights